In 2012, Kudumbashree was recognized as a National Resource Organisation (NRO) by Ministry of Rural Development (MoRD), Government of India, under the National Rural Livelihood Mission (NRLM) to provide support to other States in their poverty eradication efforts.

Subsequently, Kudumbashree NRO signed Memorandums of Understanding (MoUs) with 9 States (Assam, Bihar, Gujarat, Jharkhand, Karnataka, Maharashtra, Odisha, Rajasthan and Sikkim) to provide technical and implementation support to their State Rural Livelihood Missions (SRLMs) for the adaption of Kudumbashree’s best practices. Kudumbashree NRO provides assistance to States in undertaking pilot interventions under the Enterprises project and Panchayati Raj Institutions – Community Based Organisations (PRI-CBO) Convergence Project.

The Enterprises project identifies individuals from local communities and trains them for 6–9 months to form a cadre of community professionals called Micro-Enterprise Consultants (MEC). MEC are expected to provide hand holding support and capacity building services primarily to women entrepreneurs from rural areas in exchange for a fee. The Enterprises project is in the pilot phase in select districts of 7 States - Bihar, Gujarat, Jharkhand, Karnataka, Maharashtra, Rajasthan and Sikkim.

The PRI-CBO Convergence project identifies individuals from local communities and trains them to form a cadre of community professionals called Local Resource Groups (LRG). LRG are expected to work with community institutions and local governments to improve the efficiency and reach of poor centric programmes, promote participatory planning and inculcate democratic consciousness in local communities. The PRI-CBO Convergence project is in the pilot phase in select blocks of 7 States – Assam, Jharkhand, Karnataka, Maharashtra, Odisha, Rajasthan and Sikkim.

In 2015, Kudumbashree NRO entered into collaborations with Ethiopia and South Africa to provide support for the adaption of Kudumbashree’s best practices in these countries.

See also
Kudumbashree

References

External links
 Kudumbashree National Resource Organisation
 Kudumbashree
 National Rural Livelihoods Mission

Labour relations in India
Rural development organisations in India